Skaugumsåsen is a mountain in Asker in the county of Akershus, in southeastern Norway.

See also 
 Semsvannet and Vicinity - Elected the Place of the Millennium in Norway

Asker
Mountains of Viken